The 2018 Vietnam Open (officially known as the Yonex-Sunrise Vietnam Open 2018 for sponsorship reasons) was a badminton tournament which took place at Nguyen Du Cultural Sports Club in Vietnam from 7 to 12 August 2018 and had a total purse of $75,000.

Tournament
The 2018 Vietnam Open was the sixth Super 100 tournament of the 2018 BWF World Tour and also part of the Vietnam Open championships which had been held since 1996. This tournament was organized by the Ho Chi Minh City Badminton Association with the sanction from the BWF.

Venue
This international tournament was held at Nguyen Du Cultural Sports Club in Ho Chi Minh City, Vietnam.

Point distribution
Below is the point distribution table for each phase of the tournament based on the BWF points system for the BWF Tour Super 100 event.

Prize money
The total prize money for this tournament was US$75,000. Distribution of prize money was in accordance with BWF regulations.

Men's singles

Seeds

 Ygor Coelho de Oliveira (third round)
 Daren Liew (withdrew)
 Pablo Abián (second round)
 Vladimir Malkov (third round)
 Lu Guangzu (withdrew)
 Chong Wei Feng (third round)
 Yu Igarashi (semi-finals)
 Sitthikom Thammasin (third round)

Finals

Top half

Section 1

Section 2

Bottom half

Section 3

Section 4

Women's singles

Seeds

 Sayaka Takahashi (second round)
 Minatsu Mitani (semi-finals)
 Lee Ying Ying (second round)
 Cai Yanyan (withdrew)
 Brittney Tam (first round)
 Sung Shuo-yun (second round)
 Han Yue (final)
 Vũ Thị Trang (quarter-finals)

Finals

Top half

Section 1

Section 2

Bottom half

Section 3

Section 4

Men's doubles

Seeds

 Aaron Chia / Soh Wooi Yik (quarter-finals)
 Inkarat Apisuk / Tanupat Viriyangkura (second round)
 Shia Chun Kang / Tan Wee Gieen (second round)
 Po Li-wei / Yang Ming-tse (first round)
 Angga Pratama / Rian Agung Saputro (withdrew)
 Keiichiro Matsui / Yoshinori Takeuchi (quarter-finals)
 Hiroki Okamura / Masayuki Onodera (second round)
 Tan Boon Heong /  Yoo Yeon-seong (second round)

Finals

Top half

Section 1

Section 2

Bottom half

Section 3

Section 4

Women's doubles

Seeds

 Ayako Sakuramoto / Yukiko Takahata (first round)
 Meghana Jakkampudi / Poorvisha S. Ram (first round)
 Savitree Amitrapai / Pacharapun Chochuwong (quarter-finals)
 Misato Aratama / Akane Watanabe (champions)
 Agatha Imanuela / Siti Fadia Silva Ramadhanti (quarter-finals)
 Nami Matsuyama / Chiharu Shida (final)
 Minami Kawashima / Aoi Matsuda (quarter-finals)
 Chen Hsiao-huan / Hu Ling-fang (second round)

Finals

Top half

Section 1

Section 2

Bottom half

Section 3

Section 4

Mixed doubles

Seeds

 Evgenij Dremin / Evgenia Dimova (withdrew)
 Đỗ Tuấn Đức / Phạm Như Thảo (second round)
 Chen Tang Jie / Peck Yen Wei (second round)
 Mohamad Arif Abdul Latif Arif /  Rusydina Antardayu Riodingin (second round)
 Chang Ko-chi / Cheng Chi-ya (second round)
 Shivam Sharma / Poorvisha S. Ram (first round)
 Chen Sihang / Xu Ya (quarter-finals)
 Tseng Min-hao / Chen Hsiao-huan (first round)

Finals

Top half

Section 1

Section 2

Bottom half

Section 3

Section 4

References

External links
 Tournament Link

Vietnam Open (badminton)
Vietnam Open
Vietnam Open (badminton)
Sport in Ho Chi Minh City
Vietnam Open (badminton)